This list of the tallest buildings in Poznań ranks buildings in Poznań, Poland by their height.

Tallest buildings
Includes buildings that stand at least 60 metres tall.

See also
List of tallest buildings in Poland

References

External links

Poznań